Stapley/Main Street is a light rail station in Mesa, Arizona, on the Valley Metro system serving Phoenix and surrounding areas. It is part of the  Gilbert Road Extension, alongside Gilbert Road/Main Street station, and opened to passengers on May 18, 2019.

References

Valley Metro Rail stations
Railway stations in the United States opened in 2019